Forda is a genus of insects belonging to the family Aphididae.

The genus was first described by Carl von Heyden in 1837.

The species of this genus are found in Eurasia and Northern America.

Species:
 Forda formicaria
 Forda marginata

References

Eriosomatinae
Sternorrhyncha genera
Taxa named by Carl von Heyden